An indexer may refer to: 

 Indexer (programming)
 Torrent indexer or BitTorrent tracker
 Index (disambiguation) § Publishing and library studies, writer of the indexes of literary and non-fiction publications

See also
 Index (disambiguation)
 
 
The Indexer, journal of the Society of Indexers
[/w/index.php?search= "indexer" incategory:"Information scienceDocument management systemsMetadataLibrary science"]